The Turks in Algeria, also commonly referred to as Algerian Turks, Algerian-Turkish Algero-Turkish and Turkish-Algerians were the ethnic Turkish and renegades who emigrated to Algeria during the Ottoman period. A significant number of Turks intermarried with the native population, and the male offspring of these marriages were referred to as Kouloughlis due to their mixed Turkish and central Maghrebi heritage. However, in general, intermarriage was discouraged, in order to preserve the "Turkishness" of the community. Consequently, the terms "Turks" and "Kouloughlis" have traditionally been used to distinguish between those of full and partial Turkish ancestry.

History

Ottoman era (1515–1830)

The foundation of Ottoman Algeria was directly linked to the establishment of the Ottoman province (beylerbeylik) of the Maghreb at the beginning of the 16th century. At the time, fearing that their city would fall into Spanish hands, the inhabitants of Algiers called upon Ottoman corsairs for help. Headed by Oruç Reis and his brother Hayreddin Barbarossa, they took over the rule of the city and started to expand their territory into the surrounding areas. Sultan Selim I (r. 1512–20) agreed to assume control of the Maghreb regions ruled by Hayreddin as a province, granting the rank of governor-general (beylerbey) to Hayreddin. In addition, the Sultan sent 2,000 janissaries, accompanied by about 4,000 volunteers to the newly-established Ottoman province of the Maghreb, whose capital was to be the city of Algiers. These Turks, mainly from Anatolia, called each other "yoldaş" (a Turkish word meaning "comrade") and called their sons born of unions with local women "Kuloğlus", which implied that they considered their children's status as that of the Sultan's servants. Likewise, to indicate in the registers that a certain person is an offspring of a Turk and a local woman, the note "ibn al-turki" (or "kuloglu") was added to his name.

The exceptionally-high number of Turks greatly affected the character of the city of Algiers and that of the province at large. In 1587, the province was divided into three different provinces, which were established where the modern states of Algeria, Libya and Tunisia were to emerge. Each of the provinces was headed by a Pasha sent from Constantinople for a three-year term. The division of the Maghreb launched the process that led eventually to the janissary corps' rule over the province. From the end of the 16th century, Algiers's Ottoman elite chose to emphasise its Turkish identity and to nurture its Turkish character to a point at which it became an ideology. By so doing, the Algerian province took a different path from that of its neighbouring provinces, where local-Ottoman elites were to emerge. The aim of nurturing the elite's Turkishness was twofold: it limited the number of the privileged group (the ocak), and it demonstrated the group's loyalty to the Sultan. By the 18th century, there was 50,000 janissaries concentrated in the city of Algiers alone.

The lifestyle, language, religion, and area of origin of the Ottoman elite's members created remarkable differences between the Algerian Ottoman elite and the indigenous population. For example, members of the elite adhered to Hanafi law while the rest of the population subscribed to the Maliki school. Most of the elites originated from non-Arab regions of the Empire. Furthermore, most members of the elite spoke Ottoman Turkish while the local population spoke Algerian Arabic and even differed from the rest of the population in their dress.

Recruiting the military-administrative elite 
From its establishment, the military-administrative elite worked to reinvigorate itself by enlisting volunteers from non-Arab regions of the Ottoman Empire, mainly from Anatolia. Hence, local recruiting of Arabs was almost unheard of and during the 18th century a more or less permanent network of recruiting officers was kept in some coastal Anatolian cities and on some of the islands of the Aegean Sea. The recruitment policy was therefore one of the means employed to perpetuate the Turkishness of the Ottoman elite and was practiced until the fall of the province in 1830.

Marriages to local women and the Kuloğlus

During the 18th century, the militia practiced a restrictive policy on marriages between its members and local women. A married soldier would lose his right of residence in one of the city's eight barracks and the daily ration of bread to which he was entitled. He would also lose his right to purchase a variety of products at a preferential price. Nonetheless, the militia's marriage policy made clear distinctions among holders of different ranks: the higher the rank, the more acceptable the marriage of its holder. This policy can be understood as part of the Ottoman elite's effort to perpetuate its Turkishness and to maintain its segregation from the rest of the population. Furthermore, the militia's marriage policy, in part, emerged from fear of an increase in the number of the kuloğlus.

The kuloğlus refer to the male offspring of members of the Ottoman elite and the local Algerian women. Due to their link to the local Algerian population via his maternal family, the kuloğlus' loyalty to the Ottoman elite was suspected because of the fear that they might develop another loyalty and so they were considered a potential danger to the elite. However, the son of a non-local woman, herself an "outsider" in the local population, represented no such danger to the Ottoman elite. Therefore, the Algerian Ottoman elite had a clear policy dictating the perpetuation of its character as a special social group, which was separated from the local population.

Nonetheless, John Douglas Ruedy points out that the kuloğlus also sought to protect their Turkishness: 

In the neighbouring province of Tunisia, the maintenance of the Turkishness of the ruling group was not insisted upon, and the kuloğlus could reach the highest ranks of government. However, the janissary corps had lost its supremacy first to the Muradid dynasty (Murad Bey's son was appointed bey), and then to the Husainid dynasty. The Tunisian situation partly explains the continuation of the Algerian janissary corps' recruitment policy and the manifest will to distance the kuloğlus from the real centres of power. Nonetheless, high-ranking kuloğlus were in the service of the ocak, in military and in administrative capacities, occupying posts explicitly considered out of bounds for them; although there were no kuloğlus who was dey during the 18th century, this seems to be the only exception.

French era (1830–1962)
Once Algeria came under French colonial rule in 1830, approximately 10,000 Turks were expelled and shipped off to Smyrna; moreover, many Turks (alongside other natives) fled to other regions of the Ottoman realms, particularly to Palestine, Syria, Arabia, and Egypt. Nonetheless, by 1832, many Algerian-Turkish descended families, who had not left Algeria, joined a coalition with Emir Abdelkader in order to forge the beginning of a powerful resistance movement against French colonial rule.

Common surnames

By provenance
The following list are examples of Turkish origin surnames which express an ethnic and provenance origin from Eastern Thrace and Anatolia - regions which today form the modern borders of the Republic of Turkey: 

The following list are examples of Turkish origin surnames which express a provenance settlement of Turkish families in regions of Algeria: 

The following list are examples of Turkish origin surnames traditionally used by Turkish families in Constantine:

Acheuk-Youcef, Ali Khodja, Bachtarzi, Benabdallah Khodja, Benelmadjat, Bestandji, Bendali Braham, Bentchakar, Bensakelbordj, Bentchikou, Khaznadar, Salah Bey, Tchanderli Braham.

By occupation
The following list are examples of some Turkish origin surnames which express the traditional occupation of Turkish families which settled in Algeria:

Other surnames

Culture

The Algerian Turks generally take pride in their Ottoman-Turkish heritage but also have integrated successfully into Algerian society. Their identity is based on their ethnic Turkish roots and links to mainland Turkey but also to the customs, language, and local culture of Algeria. Due to the three centuries of Turkish rule in Algeria, today many cultural (particularly in regards to food, religion, and dress - and to a lesser extent language), architectural, as well as musical elements of Algeria are of Turkish origin or influence.

Language
During the Ottoman era, the Ottoman Turkish language was the official governing language in the region, and the Turkish language was spoken mostly by the Algerian Turkish community. However, today most Algerian Turks speak the Arabic language as their mother tongue. Nonetheless, the legacy of the Turkish language is still apparent and has influenced many words and vocabulary in Algeria. An estimated 634 Turkish words are still used in Algeria today. Therefore, in Algerian Arabic it is possible for a single sentence to include an Arabic subject, a French verb, and for the predicate to be in Berber or Turkish.

Moreover, families of Turkish origin have retained their Turkish family surnames; common names include Barbaros, Hayreddin, Osmanî, Stambouli, Torki, Turki, and Uluçali; job titles or functions have also become family names within the Algerian-Turkish community (such as Hazneci, Demirci, Başterzi, Silahtar).

Religion
The Ottoman Turks brought the teaching of the Hanafi law of Sunni Islam to Algeria; consequently, their lifestyle created remarkable differences between the Ottoman Turks and the indigenous population because the ethnic Arabs and Berbers practiced the Maliki school.

Today, the Hanafi school is still practiced among the Turkish descended families. Moreover, the Ottoman mosques in Algeria - which are still used by the Turkish minority - are distinguishable by their octagonal minarets which were built in accordance with the traditions of the Hanafi rite.

Cuisine
Today the Turkish heritage in Algeria is most notably present in their cuisine which they have introduced to Algeria (such as Turkish coffee, Lahmacun, Böreks, desserts and pastries).

Demographics

Areas of settlement

During the Ottoman era, urban society in the coastal cities of Algeria evolved into an ethnic mix of Arabs, Berbers, Turks and Kouloughlis as well as other ethnic groups (Moors, and Jews). Thus, the Turks settled mainly in the big cities of Algeria and formed their own Turkish quarters; remnants of these old Turkish quarters are still visible today, such as in Algiers (particularly in the Casbah) Annaba, Biskra, Bouïra, Médéa, Mostaganem, and Oran (such as in La Moune and the areas near the Hassan Basha Mosque). Indeed, today, the descendants of Ottoman-Turkish settlers continue to live in the big cities. In particular, the Turks have traditionally had a strong presence in the Tlemcen Province; alongside the Moors, they continue to make up a significant portion of Tlemcen's population and live within their own sectors of the city.

The Turkish minority have traditionally also had notable populations in various other cities and towns; there is an established Turkish community in Arzew, Bougie, Berrouaghia, Cherchell, Constantine, Djidjelli, Mascara, Mazagran Oued Zitoun, and Tebessa. There is also an established community in Kabylie (such as Tizi Ouzou and Zammora).

Moreover, several suburbs, towns and cities, which have been inhabited by the Turks for centuries, have been named after Ottoman rulers, Turkish families or the Turks in general, including: the Aïn El Turk district (literally "Fountain of the Turks") in Oran, the town of Aïn Torki in the Aïn Defla Province, the Aïn Turk commune in Bouïra, the town of Bir Kasdali and the Bir Kasd Ali District in the Bordj Bou Arréridj Province, the town of Bougara and the Bougara District located in Blida Province, the suburb of Hussein Dey and the Hussein Dey District in the Algiers Province, as well as the town of Salah Bey and the Salah Bey District in the Sétif Province.

Diaspora
There are many Algerian Turks who have emigrated to other countries and hence make up part of Algeria's diaspora. Initially, the first wave of migration occurred in 1830 when many Turks were forced to leave the region once the French took control over Algeria; approximately 10,000 were shipped off to Turkey whilst many others migrated to other regions of the Ottoman Empire, including Palestine, Syria, Arabia, and Egypt. Furthermore, some Turkish/Kouloughli families also settled in Morocco (such as in Tangier and Tétouan).

See also
List of Algerians of Turkish origin
Kouloughli
Ottoman Algeria
Aïn El Turk
List of Pashas and Deys of Algiers
Turkish minorities in the former Ottoman Empire
Turks in Tunisia
Turks in Libya
Turks in the Arab world
Turks in the Balkans
Turkish Cypriots
Turks in France

Notes

References

Bibliography 

 
.
.
 
.
 
.
 .
.
.
 
.

.
.
.
.
.
.
 
 
.
.
.
.
.

Ethnic groups in Algeria
Algeria
 
Algeria
Algeria